Prince Qian of the Second Rank, or simply Prince Qian, was the title of a princely peerage used in China during the Manchu-led Qing dynasty (1644–1912). As the Prince Qian peerage was not awarded "iron-cap" status, this meant that each successive bearer of the title would normally start off with a title downgraded by one rank vis-à-vis that held by his predecessor. However, the title would generally not be downgraded to any lower than a feng'en fuguo gong except under special circumstances.

The first bearer of the title was Wakeda (瓦克達; 1606–1652), Daišan's fourth son and a grandson of Nurhaci (the founder of the Qing dynasty). In 1651, Wakeda was granted the title "Prince Qian of the Second Rank" by the Shunzhi Emperor. The peerage was discontinued in 1698 after the Kangxi Emperor stripped Lioyung (留雍; Wakeda's son) of his title for committing an offence. However, the Qianlong Emperor restored the peerage in 1778 and granted it to Dongfu (洞福; Lioyung's great-grandson). Overall, the title was passed down over ten generations and held by nine persons.

Members of the Prince Qian peerage

 Wakeda (瓦克達; 1606–1652), Daišan's fourth son and Nurhaci's grandson, made a third class zhenguo jiangjun in 1646, promoted to zhenguo gong in 1647, promoted to junwang in 1648, held the title Prince Qian of the Second Rank from 1651 to 1652, posthumously honoured as Prince Qianxiang of the Second Rank (謙襄郡王) in 1671
 Garse (噶爾賽), Wakeda's third son, initially a third class fengguo jiangjun, held the title of a feng'en zhenguo gong from 1667 to 1669, demoted to feng'en jiangjun in 1669, restored as a feng'en zhenguo gong in 1682, stripped of his title in 1686
 Haiqing (海清), Garse's eldest son, held the title of a feng'en zhenguo gong from 1682 to 1686, stripped of his title in 1686
 Lioyung (留雍), Wakeda's second son, initially a third class fengguo jiangjun, promoted to zhenguo jiangjun in 1667, demoted to fengguo jiangjun in 1669, promoted to feng'en zhenguo gong in 1686, stripped of his title in 1698
 Taihun (台渾), Lioyung's third son, held the title of a third class fuguo jiangjun from 1694 to 1720, stripped of his title in 1720
 Zhongduan (忠端), Taihun's son
 Dongfu (洞福), Zhongduan's son, held the title of a first class zhenguo jiangjun from 1778 to 1792
 Dewen (德文), Dongfu's second son, initially a second class fengguo jiangjun, held the title of a zhenguo jiangjun from 1792 to 1826
 Sufan (蘇藩), Dewen's eldest son, held the title of a first class fengguo jiangjun from 1812 to 1826, held the title of a first class zhenguo jiangjun from 1826 to 1836
 Sumin (蘇敏), Dewen's second son, held the title of a third class fuguo jiangjun from 1816 to 1823, had no male heir
 Sufang (蘇芳), Dewen's third son, held the title of a third class fuguo jiangjun from 1821 to 1851
 Chengduan (承瑞), Sufang's fifth son and Sufan's adopted son, held the title of a zhenguo jiangjun from 1836 to 1867
 Yuekang (岳康), Chengze's son and Chengduan's adopted son, held the title of a zhenguo jiangjun from 1868 to 1898
 Chengfan (成藩), Sufang's eldest son, held the title of a third class fengguo jiangjun from 1824 to 1859
 Binchang (斌昌), Chengfan's second son, held the title of a feng'en jiangjun from 1859 to 1884
 Enrong (恩榮), Binchang's eldest son, held the title of a feng'en jiangjun from 1884
 Enhou (恩厚), Binchang's second son and Yuekang's adopted son, held the title of a zhenguo jiangjun from 1898
 Suzhe (蘇哲), Dewen's fourth son, held the title of a third class fuguo jiangjun from 1829 to 1862, stripped of his title in 1862
 Degongtai (德恭泰), Dongfu's third son, held the title of a second class fengguo jiangjun from 1795 to 1820
 Daying (達英), Degongtai's second son, held the title of a feng'en jiangjun from 1721 to 1843, had no male heir

Family tree

See also
 Prince Li (禮)
 Royal and noble ranks of the Qing dynasty

References
 

Qing dynasty princely peerages